Royal Air Force Witchford or RAF Witchford is a former Royal Air Force station about  southwest of Ely, Cambridgeshire, England and  north of Cambridge, Cambridgeshire.

History
 No. 115 Squadron RAF first started using RAF Witchford from 26 November 1943 with the Avro Lancaster II before changing to the Mk I and III Lancasters in March 1944 before moving to RAF Graveley on 10 September 1945.
 No. 195 Squadron RAF reformed at the airfield on 1 October 1944 with the Lancaster I and III before moving to RAF Wratting Common on 13 November 1944 where the squadron disbanded on 14 August 1945.
 No. 196 Squadron RAF started using the airfield on 19 Jul 1943 with the Vickers Wellington X until these were replaced with the Short Stirling III during their stay. The squadron left on 18 November 1943 moving to RAF Leicester East.
 No. 513 Squadron RAF formed at Witchford on 15 September 1943 with the Stirling III before disbanding on 21 November 1943 at the airfield.
 No. 29 Aircrew Holding Unit.

A total of 99 bombers despatched on operations from Witchford were lost, 8 being Stirlings and 91 Lancasters.

RAF Witchford was initially included among the initial sites for the Project Emily deployment of PGM-17 Thor intermediate range ballistic missiles, at the instigation of the Americans in 1958, but  the land was owned by the Church Commissioners, and nearby RAF Mepal was substituted. The main selection criterion was the condition of the road network connecting the bases; a grade of more than one in seventeen was considered an unacceptable risk of grounding the missile transport.

An extensive history of the station, with some coverage of RAF Mepal, is contained in 'Memories of RAF Witchford' by Barry and Sue Aldridge.

Current use

Most of the site is now the Lancaster Way Business Park, with the rest used for farming.

See also

List of former Royal Air Force stations

References

Citations

Bibliography

External links

 – by a former RAF Squadron 115 pilot
Loss of Lancaster HK559 - an account of just one crew lost from Witchford and of subsequent commemoration ceremonies
The RAF Witchford & Mepal Display – collection of memorabilia

Military units and formations established in 1943
Royal Air Force stations in Cambridgeshire
Royal Air Force stations of World War II in the United Kingdom